ʿAbd Allāh ibn Jaʿfar (699 or 702/704), was a companion and relative of the Islamic prophet Muhammad, a nephew of Ali and a half-brother of Muhammad ibn Abi Bakr. He was loyal to Ahl al-Bayt in spite of his absence at the Battle of Karbala. He is reported to have said: ”Thanks to God Almighty, I could not support al-Husayn ibn Ali at Karbala, but my two sons (Awn and Muhammad) did."  According to Richard Francis Burton he is widely recognized as the most sympathetic amongst Arabs.  His grave is situated near Aqil ibn Abi Talib and Abu Sufyan ibn al-Harith (the grandson of Abd al-Muttalib) in Jannat al-Baqi

Early life

He was the son of Ja'far ibn Abi Talib and Asma bint Umais. They had emigrated to Abyssinia in 616, and Abd Allah and his two brothers were born there. Abd Allah was the first of Muslims to be born in the land of Abyssinia  After the birth of Abd Allah in Abyssinia (Habesha Presently Ethiopia), the king of the Kingdom of Aksum (Najashi) was blessed with a son too. He immediately asked the parents of Abd Allah ibn Ja'far about the name of their child. Upon knowing the name of Ja'far's family, King of Abyssinia also chose the name “Abd Allah” for his first son. It is also stated that Asma bint Umays was the nursing mother of son of Abyssinian King. The younger brother of Abd Allah appears to be the first child in the Muslim history who was named Muhammad after the Prophet of Islam.
The family returned to Arabia in 628 and settled in Medina.

Muhammad's Supplication & instruction

In addition to Ibn Hajar's reference, it is said that after 3 days of Ja'far's death Muhammad went to the house of Asma and called for the children of Ja'far. He then said about each of them “As for Muhammad, he resembles our uncle Abi Talib.  As for Abd Allah, he resembles me in terms of both my appearance and character. Afterward, Muhammad took the right hand of Abd Allah and said “O Allah, provide a successor for Ja'far in his family, and bless Abd Allah in his business, and repeated this appeal to Almighty thrice.  Muhammad instructed the sons of Abi Talib, namely Ja'far, Aqil and Ali that they should arrange marriages of their children with their cousins.

Marriage and Family Life

Ali had particularly wished that his daughters should marry Ja'far's sons. When Abd Allah asked for Zaynab's hand, Ali accepted it.  Abd Allah and Zaynab had two children.

According to Shaykh Muhammad Abbas Qummi, he had 20 sons from different wives, including five children from Zaynab bint Ali. Daira-e-Maarif Islamia (Circle of Islamic Knowledge) of University of the Punjab (pages 568-70, Vol.X) describes that Zaynabi is a progeny of Abd Allah’s son Ali through Zaynab bint Ali

Abd Allah ibn Ja'far was one of the richest people in Medina and a famous philanthropist who was called as  “Bahr al-Joud” which means an ocean of charity.

When Ali became the Caliph in 656 and moved from Medina to Kufa, Zaynab and Abd Allah joined him.

His wife’s journey with Husayn ibn Ali

It is related that Zaynab already forecast the journey (journey to Karbala) before her marriage and permission for accompanying with her brother was obtained during marriage negotiations.
With regard to Absent of Abd Allah in Battle of Karbala, it is said it was due to his poor eye sighting consequently he was unable to bear the rigidities of journey and war. Knowing Husayn's journey to Kufa, Zaynab, the wife of Abd Allah ibn Ja'far begged her husband's permission to accompany her brother. Realizing anxiousness of her husband she stated that:

Abd Allah then granted his permission and sent their two sons for the destined journey.

Abd Allah was concurrently married to Layla bint Mas'ud. With reference to books ‘Nasab e Quraish Page-83’ and ‘Jameerath ul Nasab by Ibn Hazm page 62’ it is described that Layla bint Mas'ud ibn Khalid was “al-Zawja al-Thaniya (second wife)” through  this marriage he had two daughters (Umm Muhammad and Umm Abiha) and four sons (Yahya, Harun, Salih and Musa).

Career

Battles

With regard to his presence in the Battle of the Camel, it is indicated that at the end of Battle, while entrusting the return of Aisha to Medina under security of her brother Muhammad ibn Abi Bakr, Ali ordered for payment of  12,000 Dirhams to Aisha. Abd Allah thinking that the amount was too little, brought out a larger sum for Aisha.  According to Ibn A'tham al-Kufi in Battle of Siffin he was commanding the infantry in the army of Ali ibn Abi Talib together with his cousins Muslim ibn Aqil, Muhammad ibn al-Hanafiyya and step brother Muhammad ibn Abi Bakr.

Politics

He was a staunch supporter of his uncle Ali in the civil war. He maintained a reputation for liberality and patronage in Medina, earning him the nickname “the Ocean of Generosity”. After the demise of Ali ibn Abi Talib, Abd Allah ibn Ja'far together with his cousins Hasan and Husayn participated in washing the body and dressed him for burial in three robes without a Kurta (a long shirt).

In addition to some spy reporting  to Ali ibn Abi Talib that Qays ibn Sa'd, his governor at Egypt had given allegiance to Mu'awiya I,  he received his letter which was written in perspective of affairs emerged on account of a conspiracy  caused by opponent of Ali. Ali called his sons and Abd Allah ibn Ja'far and consulted the matter. Upon advice of Abd Allah, Ali wrote a letter ordering Qays ibn Sa'd to seek the people to give their allegiance as the Muslims have done (after the 3rd Caliph).  But, if they do not, then fight them. The governor of Egypt against this communication wrote a letter to Ali ibn Abi Talib. Then Abd Allah ibn Ja'far requested his father in law to replace Qays ibn Sa'd with Muhammad ibn Abi Bakr as governor of Egypt and pleaded that if he really has gone over to Mu'awiya, he will refuse to give up Egypt. However, according to Tabari it was a poor advice consequent to meeting of Qays ibn Sa'd with Ali during the period of killing of Muhammad ibn Abi Bakr.

Once a Chief of Iraqi village asked Abd Allah ibn Ja'far to recommend his case before Caliph Ali for accomplishment. He did so and matter of that chief was satisfied by Ali ibn Abi Talib. As a gratification the chief sent 40,000 Dirhams through some people to Abd Allah, who refused the money saying that we do not sell our good deeds

His vision for Husayn

Knowing the death of his two sons in the Battle of Karbala, people were offering condolences to Abd Allah, one of his Mawili  (Abu al-Lislas [a companion]) said that “this is what we have met and what has come upon us through Husayn ibn Ali” on this statement he struck him with his sandal and told that I am pleased that my two sons killed with my brother and cousin.  By God! If I had been present with him, I would have preferred not to leave him in order that I would be killed with him. He then seeking attention of people consoling him, said that “Praise be to God, Who has made life hard, console Husayn ibn Ali with my own hands, my two sons consoled him.

Letter to Husayn

Ibn Khaldun in chapter 2 volume II title “Yazid-I” from 60 to 64 AH, it is described that Abd Allah sent a letter through his sons Awn and Muhammad, to Husayn, requesting that “for God sake come back. It is my advice to you in anxiety that you would be killed and Ahl al-Bayt destroyed. As a result, earth’s light will come to an end, there would be no leader for Muslims.  Please do not hurry in journey, I would be reaching there after this letter." Later he went to Amr ibn Sa'id who was Yazid's governor of Mecca and asked him to write a letter to Husayn offering him a guarantee of harmless behavior assuring him kindness and open-handedness. "Show trust to him in your letter and request him to return." This letter was replied by Husayn too.

See also
Yahya ibn Umar- Descendant of Abd Allah ibn Ja'far who led a rebellion

References

External links 
https://web.archive.org/web/20070319112108/http://www.jafariyanews.com/articles/2k5/13june_syedaZaynab.htm biography
https://web.archive.org/web/20110716082212/http://www.dartabligh.org/months/jamadilawwal/janabe_zainab%28a.s%29.html
https://web.archive.org/web/20091230032022/http://home.earthlink.net/~downloadquran/Maqtal_al-Husain.pdf (See Maqtal al-Husayn page 213).

Year of birth missing
680 deaths
Banu Hashim
Sahabah hadith narrators
Burials at Jannat al-Baqī